The 2022 FIA Motorsport Games Drifting Cup will be the second FIA Motorsport Games Drifting Cup, to be held at Circuit Paul Ricard, France on 26 October to 30 October 2022. The event was the part of the 2022 FIA Motorsport Games.

Each competitor had two solo runs, with the higher-scoring run counting towards a final qualifying classification. Top-16 drivers were eligible to contest the Final Battle stage. Drivers were seeded according to their qualifying results, with the best-scoring qualifier going up against the 16th-placed competitor, second facing 15th, etc. In qualifying, judges scored competitors using four criteria – line, angle, style and speed – up to a maximum total of 100 points. In the Final Battle phase, each judge scored the round individually with a majority decision between a three-person panel determining the winner.

Entry list

Results

Qualifying 
      Advances to the Top 16
      Eliminated

Top 32 and Final

References

External links

Drifting Cup